Jules-Fontaine Sambwa (12 November 1940 – 4 March 1998) was a Zairean political officeholder and economist.

Biography
Jules-Fontaine Sambwa Pida Nbagui was born in Mbandaka, on 12 November 1940. He died on 4 March 1998. After graduating in Economy and Finance at the University of Brussels in 1967, he exercised the following high offices in the Republic of Zaire:
 Economic council at the President’s Office (1967–1969)
 Assistant director at the President’s Office and then, council at the Bank of Zaire (1969–1970)
 Administrator at the SOFIDE (1970)
 Governor of the Bank of Zaire (from September 1970 to August 1977)
 Assistant director at the President’s Office (from March 1979 to August 1980)
 Governor of the Bank of Zaire (from August 1980 to April 1985)
 Minister of Economy and Industry (1985)
 State minister of the Plan (from April 1985 to September 1987)
 Vice-premier Commissioner of the Zaire government in charge with the economic sectors (from September 1987 to April 1988)
 First commissioner of State of the Zaire government (from April 1988 to November 1988)
 President of the Court of Accounts (from November 1988 to January 1990)
 Minister of Finance of Zaire (from March 1993 to April 1993 and from April 1993 to July 1994)

At the same time, he was also a professor at the University of Kinshasa where, as part of the Faculty of Economy, he was "titular to the class of international economy".

Visiting Europe since 1991, Jules-Fontaine Sambwa carried on his research and studies on the development of Sub-Saharan Africa until his death.

His care for a positive contribution to the reflection of diverse intellectuals on the emergence of rules of law in Sub-Saharan Africa made him accept the office of President of the “Zaire Club 2000” in 1994.

Awards
He had been promised to the following honorary distinctions:
 Grand Cordon de l’Ordre national du Léopard (Zaïre) ;
 Commandeur de l’Ordre de la Couronne (Belgique) ;
 Commandeur de l’Ordre national de la Légion d'honneur (France) ;
 Commandeur de l’Ordre national de la République tunisienne.

References

1940 births
1998 deaths
People from Mbandaka
Finance ministers of the Democratic Republic of the Congo
Government ministers of the Democratic Republic of the Congo
Governors of the Banque Centrale du Congo
Commandeurs of the Légion d'honneur
Commanders of the Order of the Crown (Belgium)